Roaring River Park is a heritage and nature park near Petersfield, Westmoreland Parish, Jamaica.

The park is on the site of the Roaring River Estate which belonged to the Beckford family: Peter Beckford, William Beckford.

The Roaring River runs underground, before appearing near to Petersfield, close to the Roaring River Cave, a series of limestone caverns with a small mineral spring inside. The Roaring River Citizens Association, a local community group, looks after the caves and provides guided tours for visitors. There is also a fresh water sinkhole where visitors can swim and a landscaped private garden where visitors are welcome for a contribution.

The river provides the parish capital, Savanna-la-Mar, with its water supply and it is the most important source of water in central Westmoreland and the Georges plain.

External links
Jamaican Caves Organisation – TPDCo report for Roaring River Cave
Roaring River Jamaica Review – The Enthralling Cave and Nature Attraction

References 

Parks in Jamaica
Geography of Westmoreland Parish
Tourist attractions in Westmoreland Parish
Plantations in Jamaica